Algeria has competed at every celebration of the Mediterranean Games. Its athletes have won a total of 293 medals.

Medal tables

Medals by Mediterranean Games

Below the table representing all Algerian medals around the games. Till now, Algeria win 293 medals and 86 gold medals.

Medals by sport

Athletes with most medals 
The Algerian athlete who won the most medals in the history of the Mediterranean Games, by swimmer Salim Iles.

Notes: in Khaki the athletes still in activity.

Medal account by gender

See also
Algeria at the Olympics
Algeria at the African Games
Algeria at the Pan Arab Games
Algeria at the Islamic Solidarity Games
Algeria at the Paralympics

References